"The Rattlin' Bog" is an Irish folk song. It is a version of an internationally distributed folk song type. In the Roud Folk Song Index it has the number 129, and carries such titles as "The Everlasting Circle", "The Tree on the Hill", "The Green Grass Grew All Around", and "Down in the Lowlands", as well as "The Rattlin' Bog", The adjective rattlin' means "splendid" in the context of this song. It is a cumulative song, similar to "The Twelve Days of Christmas", as it has a list at the end of each verse which grows throughout the piece. The Roud index lists 180 versions collected from oral tradition in English, and the song has analogues in French, Italian and German as well. Since it is a folk song, it has been transmitted over generations orally and aurally so many versions coexist and it may be impossible and even nonsensical to seek a single authoritative version of the song's lyrics. The earliest version appears to be "March to the Battlefield" in "Riley's Flute Melodies" published by Edward Riley (1769 - 1829). In 1877 water-colour painter and folk-song collector Miss Marianne Harriet Mason (1845 -1932) published a version called "Green Grass Grows all Around" in "Nursery Rhymes and Country Songs".

Performing
During a performance, it is typical for the song to increase in speed with each additional verse, almost as a challenge to determine who can sing the lyrics the fastest without getting mixed up. 
 
Some performances have one singer leading the song, singing the "Now on that..." lines solo.  The whole group then joins in for the cumulative list and chorus. In some live performances, the audience sings along for as long as they can keep up, with most only singing the chorus by the end of the song.
 
Many variations exist where additional verses are added or exchanged to suit the locale where the song is performed. North American folk group The Idlers customarily sing about a bird inside an egg inside another bird that is in the nest, while others have a bird in the egg in the nest.  Additionally, the group added a rash on the flea as a final verse. County Durham folk singer Ed Pickford added further verses going as far as an amoeba, in the process creating a popular drinking game as players try to keep up. Seamus Kennedy added even further by following an amoeba with a paramecium, followed by a virus, and finally a subatomic particle. Irish Singer Philip Noone took the song in a different direction completely by giving the chick a cigarette and ending with the smoke coming from the cigarette.
 
The song can be sung as an echo, where each line is sung by a lead and then repeated by others.

Notable recordings 
 Golden Bough performs this on their album Kids at Heart: Celtic Songs for Children.
 Authority Zero performs this on their album Andiamo (hidden track).
 Red Grammer performs this on his Down The Do Re Mi recording.
 A Scottish version of the song is heard in the 1973 film The Wicker Man
 Schooner Fare performs this on their 1983 album Alive
 It is sung by a children's choir in the 2019 film The Hole in the Ground, and the song's lyrics tie into a mysterious hole that causes the events of the film.
The Irish Descendants, a Newfoundland band, recorded and performed a version.
 Dan Zanes performed this song on his 2002 album Night Time.
 The Wiggles perform this song on their 2019 album Party Time!
 In 2017, the sisters Patrice O'Connor and Clodagh McCarthy's impromptu performance of the song at the end of Patrice O'Connor's wedding reception, was posted on YouTube and became a viral phenomenon. It was one of the most widely shared Irish videos ever posted to the internet. The resulting notoriety meant that they acquired the soubriquet, "the Rattlin' Bog Sisters" and were invited to a major Irish music festival in the United States.

References

External links
The “Rattlin’ Bog Sisters” - Patrice O’Connor and Clodagh McCarthy's performance.
The Irish Rovers version

Irish folk songs
Cumulative songs
Songs about plants